Tes is a sum (district) of Uvs Province in western Mongolia.

It is named after the Tesiin gol river that flows through the sum. Part of the area is covered with sand dunes. The sum's western end is the eastern shore of Uvs Nuur.

Populated places in Mongolia
Districts of Uvs Province